Yélimané is a town and principal settlement of the commune of Guidimé in the Cercle of Yélimané in the Kayes Region of south-western Mali, near the border of Mauritania.

It is served by Yélimané Airport.

References

External links
 Cercle of Yélimané

Populated places in Kayes Region